Hezekiah Beers Pierrepont (1768–1838) was a merchant, farmer, landowner and land developer in Brooklyn and New York state. He restored the spelling of the family surname from "Pierpont" to "Pierrepont", its original French spelling.

Life and career
Pierrepont was born in New Haven, Connecticut in 1768 of a long-established New England family – his grandfather was one of the founders of Yale University.

After making some money by speculating on the national debt, in 1793 Pierrepont, at the age of 25, launched a career as a merchant-adventurer.  He relocated to Paris and, with his cousin, began to import goods to France, later expanding the company's scope to India and China.  The business came to an end when his ship, the Confederacy, was captured in the China Sea by privateers in 1797, while he was on board. Having made a small fortune, he was now bankrupt, and returned to the United States.  He settled in Brooklyn in 1802.

Pierrepont married Anna Marie Constable, from a prominent New York merchant and landowning family, and through a wedding present from her father, William Constable, of a half a million acres of land, became a major property owner in upstate New York; the town of Pierrepont, New York is named after him. He bought  – part of the Livingston estate, plus the Benson, De Bevoise and Remsen farms – on what was then called "Clover Hill", now Brooklyn Heights, and built a mansion there. Pierrepont purchased and expanded Philip Livingston's gin distillery on the East River at what is now Joralemon Street, where he produced Anchor Gin.  Although very popular, competition from other distillers cut into his profits, and he left the business in 1819.

Brooklyn Heights

Wishing to sub-divide and develop his property, Pierrepont realized the need for regularly scheduled ferry service across the East River, and to this end he became a prominent investor in Robert Fulton's New York and Brooklyn Steam Ferry Boat Company, using his influence on Fulton's behalf; he eventually became a part owner and a director of the company.  Fulton's ferry began running in 1814, and Brooklyn received a charter as a village from the state of New York in 1816, thanks to the influence of Pierrepont and other prominent landowners.   The city then prepared for the establishment of a street grid, although there were competing plans for the size of the lots. John and Jacob Hicks, who also owned property on Brooklyn Heights, north of Pierrepont's, favored smaller lots, as they were pitching their land to tradesman and artisans already living in Brooklyn, not attempting to lure merchants and bankers from Manhattan as Pierrepont was. To counter the Hickses' proposal, Pierrepont hired a surveyor and submitted an alternative.  In the end, the Hickses' plan was adopted north of Clark Street, and Pierrepont's, featuring 25 by 100 foot (8 by 30 meter) lots, south of it.

Along with streets came sidewalks, water pumps, and the institution of a watch. By 1823 Pierrepoint was advertising and selling lots to New York merchant and bankers, lauding the ease of transportation by ferry as opposed to by land from upper Manhattan, and the special and "select" quality of the neighborhood. Brooklyn Heights soon became the "first commuter suburb", and Pierrepont the "first important suburban developer".

In 1834, when Brooklyn began to consider building a grand City Hall to rival the one across the East River in New York City (Manhattan), Pierrepont and his son, Henry E. Pierrepont – who had studied cities in Europe – decided to develop some of their unused open land behind Brooklyn Heights on the model of European cities.  Wishing to have the new City Hall located there as an anchor, since the land was almost a mile away from the waterfront where commercial interests were concentrated, they and Henry Remsen sold the City of Brooklyn a triangular plot at the intersection of Fulton, Joralemon and Court Streets, as the site for City Hall to be built on.  The cornerstone for what is now Brooklyn Borough Hall was laid there in 1836.

Pierrepont died in 1838 in Brooklyn.  He is buried in Green-Wood Cemetery, which was founded in part by his son, Henry.  Hezekiah and his wife Anna are memorialized in the Pierrepont Family Memorial, a Gothic Revival pavilion designed by Richard Upjohn.

References
Notes

Bibliography

External links

Finding Aid to the Pierrepont Family Papers, 1805-1919 at the New York State Library, accessed May 11, 2016.

Brooklyn Heights
History of Brooklyn
1768 births
1838 deaths
Businesspeople from New Haven, Connecticut
People from Brooklyn Heights
Real estate and property developers